Eidi Mordeh-ye Bala (also Romanized as ʿEīdī Mordeh-ye Bālā) is a village in Ahmadfedaleh Rural District, Sardasht District, Dezful County, Khuzestan Province, Iran. At the 2006 census, its population was 72, in 11 families.

References 

Populated places in Dezful County